The Department of Infrastructure is a department of the Isle of Man Government.

History
The department was created in April 2010 from the Department of Transport.

The Department of Transport was itself created in 1994 by the merger of the transport functions of the Department of Tourism, Leisure and Transport and the Department of Highways, Ports and Properties.

Functions
Highways
Airports
Harbours
Works
Quarries
Planning 
Building control
Government property
Estates and architects
Meat plant
Animal waste
Waste management operations
Public transport

Non-governmental agencies reporting to the department
Manx Electricity Authority
Water and Sewerage Authority
Local government
Planning Authority
Health and Safety Executive Authority
Road Transport and Licensing Committee

Previous ministers

Previous Ministers for Infrastructure
Phil Gawne MHK, 2014-2016
Laurence Skelly MHK, 2014
David Cretney MHK, 2011-2014
Phil Gawne MHK, 2010-2011

Previous Ministers for Transport
David Anderson MHK, 2006-2010
Phil Braidwood MHK, 2005-2006
John Shimmin MHK, 2001-2005
Tony Brown MHK, 1996-2001
David North MHK, 1994-1996

Previous Ministers of Highways, Ports and Properties
David North MHK, 1991-1994
Arnold Callin, 1986-1991

See also
Isle of Man Transport
Northern Lighthouse Board (the general lighthouse authority for the Isle of Man and Scotland)

External links
 https://www.gov.im/about-the-government/departments/infrastructure/

Government of the Isle of Man
Transport in the Isle of Man